WFTE (90.3 FM) was a radio station licensed to serve Mount Cobb, Pennsylvania, and (105.7 FM) Scranton, Pennsylvania  The station's licensee was Community Radio Collective, Inc., a 501(c)(3) non-profit charitable organization.

WFTE Community Radio aired live on the air in 2011. With translator W289AU on 105.7 FM, WFTE Community Radio broadcast to around 500,000 residents in the greater Scranton, Pennsylvania area.

WFTE's license was cancelled by the Federal Communications Commission on June 27, 2018, due to the station having been silent since September 27, 2016.

References

External links

FTE
Community radio stations in the United States
Radio stations established in 2011
2011 establishments in Pennsylvania
Defunct radio stations in the United States
Radio stations disestablished in 2018
2018 disestablishments in Pennsylvania
Defunct community radio stations in the United States
FTE